East Rochester is an unincorporated community and census-designated place (CDP) in southern West Township, Columbiana County, Ohio, United States. The population was 224 as of the 2020 census. It lies along U.S. Route 30, and has a post office with the ZIP code 44625. It is part of the Salem micropolitan area and the greater Youngstown–Warren area.

History

East Rochester was originally known officially as "Rochester", and under the latter name was platted in 1834.  The Cleveland and Pittsburgh Railroad was built through the settlement in 1852. When the post office was established, the name "East Rochester" was adopted to avoid repetition with another Rochester, Ohio. A post office called East Rochester has been in operation since 1840.

Geography
The nearest incorporated community is Minerva,  to the west.

It is in the valley of Sandy Creek, which flows west to the Tuscarawas River, a tributary of the Ohio River.

Education
Children in East Rochester are served by the Minerva Local School District. The current schools serving East Rochester are:
 Minerva Elementary School – – grades K-5
 Minerva Middle School – grades 6-8
 Minerva High School – grades 9-12

References

Census-designated places in Ohio
Census-designated places in Columbiana County, Ohio
1834 establishments in Ohio
Populated places established in 1834